Constance of Normandy (between 1057 and 1061 – 13 August 1090) was a Duchess of Brittany.

She was one of the nine children of William the Conqueror and Matilda of Flanders. She was born in Normandy, where her father was duke. William of Jumièges, the monk who chronicled the 1066 Norman conquest of England, names Constance second among the daughters of King William and Queen Matilda. No source indicates the order of birth of the couple's daughters, however.

In 1086, Constance's father arranged a marriage between the duke of Brittany Alan Fergant and Constance, who was already nearly 30, to ensure peace at his Western border. Like her mother, Constance was an able administrator. William of Malmesbury, an early 12th century historian, wrote that her "severe and conservative manner" made Constance an unpopular duchess. According to his contemporary, Orderic Vitalis, however, Constance was caring, considerate, and well-liked by her subjects. William of Malmesbury alleges that her husband had their servants poison her. She died on 13 August 1090.

References 

|-

11th-century births
1090 deaths
English princesses
House of Normandy
Duchesses of Brittany
Murdered royalty
11th-century English people
11th-century English women
Year of birth unknown
Year of birth uncertain
11th-century Breton people
11th-century French women
Children of William the Conqueror
Daughters of kings